The Steps of the Sun is a 1983 science fiction novel by the American author Walter Tevis. It is about a future energy crisis, and a world in which China has become the leading superpower.

Literary reference
The title is taken from William Blake's poem, "Ah! Sun-flower":

Ah Sun-flower! weary of time,
Who countest the steps of the Sun
Seeking after that sweet golden clime
Where the travellers journey is done.

Reception
Reviewer Dave Langford said, "Well written and characterized, this has an old-fashioned feel despite up-to-date lack of inhibitions." Dave Pringle's review said "I found this an irritating book, implausible, overlong, outdated and would-be risque."

Reviews
Review by Faren Miller (1983) in Locus, #273 October 1983 
Review by Brian Stableford (1984) in Foundation, #30 March 1984 
Review by Tom Easton (1984) in Analog Science Fiction/Science Fact, May 1984 
Review by David Barrett (1984) in Vector 121 
Review by David Pettus (1985) in Thrust, #22, Summer 1985

References

External links
 Steps of the Sun 
 Walter Tevis talks about science fiction, "speculative fiction," and his novels of the future, The Steps of the Sun and Mockingbird.

1980s science fiction novels
1983 American novels
American_post-apocalyptic_novels
American science fiction novels
Doubleday (publisher) books
Science fiction novels by Walter Tevis